Toongabbie railway station is located on the Main Western line, serving the Sydney suburb of Toongabbie. It is served by Sydney Trains T1 Western and T5 Cumberland line services.

History
Toongabbie station opened on 26 April 1880. The station was a small, unattended conditional stopping place. The first platform was on the northern side of the track. When the line was duplicated in March 1886, an additional platform was added on the south side of the tracks. A disc on the end of a five-foot pole was held up by intending passengers to stop the train. The station was rebuilt in the 1940s when the Main Western line was quadrupled. In 2018, work was completed on an accessibility upgrade which like its neighbouring stations Pendle Hill and Wentworthville included a new concourse, footbridge and lifts as part of the Station Accessibility Upgrade Program.

Platforms & services

Transport links
Hillsbus operate two routes via Toongabbie station:
705: Parramatta station to Blacktown station via Pendle Hill, Seven Hills & Lalor Park
711: Parramatta station to Blacktown station via Westmead Hospital, Seven Hills & Lalor Park

Toongabbie station is served by two NightRide routes:
N70:  to Town Hall station
N71:  to Town Hall station

References

External links

Toongabbie station details Transport for New South Wales

Easy Access railway stations in Sydney
Main Western railway line, New South Wales
Railway stations in Sydney
Railway stations in Australia opened in 1880